Kherbet Rouha is a town in the Rashaya District of Lebanon. The town is known for having the largest mosque towers in Lebanon (tallest minaret:  in height).

People from Kherbet Rouha have migrated to many points around the world, mainly Canada, United States, Brazil, and UAE. In Canada, most families originating from Kherbet Rouha are represented in Edmonton, Alberta and Calgary, Alberta,. North America also has many citizens from Kherbet Rouha that live in other cities such as Lac La Biche, Windsor, Woodstock, London, Winnipeg, Toronto and Dearborn, Michigan. There is also a small group of early immigrants to the United States who settled in the Turtle Mountain region of North Dakota. Several families still remain there almost a century later. It is still possible to visit one of the oldest Islamic cemeteries in the United States in Dunseith, North Dakota, with tombstones dating back to the early 20th century. The current mayor, Mahmoud Eltasse, has been elected by the majority.

Etymology
The name Kherbet Rouha literally translates to mean "broken soul". A legend says the village originally was named Madinat Al Rouha'a, which translates to mean the City of Souls, but many wars and natural disasters "broke" the village seven times giving it a broken soul. It is also believed that the meaning of Kherbet Rouha is of Turkish origin, Kherbet meaning "village" and Rouha meaning "soul" making the translation of the name to "Village of Souls'.

History
In 1838, Eli Smith noted Kherbet Rouha's population being Sunni Muslims and Christians.

Infrastructure

Agriculture
Kherbet Rouha's land is both on the mountain side and in the valley. Until recently, most of Kherbet Rouha's occupants lived off of their land. The majority of the valley's land was used for growing wheat, chickpeas (hummus), lentils, sunflower, cucumbers, and sometimes a local breed of watermelons which don't grow very large, but are brighter red inside with a thin shell and have few but much-larger-than-usual seeds. The mountain land is usually used to grow trees and vine fruits because of the difficulty with plowing inclined land. The most common are figs, olives, grapes, quince and sumac. Also, many people grow mint and parsley in their home gardens.

Traditionally, many people kept livestock as well, most homes until as recent as the early 80s had a donkey or two for transportation. When a home kept livestock, they had a large flock of goats, sheep or a combination, or they had one or two cows and a few chickens and instead focused on their agriculture. Due to the geography of the land, it is still difficult to plow many of the olive and fig orchards and grape vineyards so traditional methods utilizing animals is common place.

Due to its conservative Muslim Sunni background, the owners of grape vineyards never sold their grapes for wine production no matter how financially strapped they were. Instead, many made raisins and a grape syrup known as "dibis" to sell. Also being part of the mountain region, Kherbet Rouha belongs to a group of villages that were famous for selling dairy products such  as yogurt, cheese and kishk (a dried powder made of yogurt and cracked wheat which is cooked into a soup, it preserves well due to the fat in the yogurt, the added salt and the drying process).

To preserve agriculture, the villagers built their homes on the mountain side, and in many cases used the mountain as a wall of the house and left the valley land for farming. In recent years, as former immigrants returned home, there was a shortage of living space, and homes have become more commonly built in the valley land. Very few citizens still farm their land, especially those who are temporary residents who rely on their income from an outside source.

Education
In the past 10–15 years, and due to the recently built universities in the area, the youth in the village have become more ambitious with regards to their studies, and the number of university graduates is growing exponentially each year. There has been a "westernization" of village life as people focus on the industrialized job market and earn higher degrees. Even agriculture is controlled by a few members of the community who thrive in it. A big percentage of the graduates studied at LIU.

Commerce
Many new apartment buildings have been built with rental and ownership options, most commonly buildings are built with multi-purpose to increase revenue and the first floor general are made up of retail and service rental units, the second floor houses medical and professional offices and any other consecutive floors contain residential apartments for rent or purchase. Within Kherbet Rouha, there are multiple options of shoe stores, bakeries (desserts only), gas stations, home repair, computer/electronic devices shops, specialty clothing shops, grocers, furniture shops, and barber shops.

References

Bibliography

External links
Khirbet Rouha, Localiban

Populated places in Rashaya District
Sunni Muslim communities in Lebanon